Dharti Ke Lal ( Children of the Earth) is a 1946 Hindustani film, the first directorial venture of the noted film director Khwaja Ahmad Abbas (K. A. Abbas). It was jointly written by Khwaja Ahmad Abbas and Bijon Bhattacharya, based on plays by Bhattacharya and the story Annadata by Krishan Chander. The film had music by Ravi Shankar, with lyrics by Ali Sardar Jafri, Nemichand Jain, Vamiq, and Prem Dhawan.

The film was based on the Bengal famine of 1943, which killed millions of Bengali people, and was one of the first films in Indian cinema's social-realist movement. In 1949, Dharti Ke Lal also became the first Indian film to receive widespread distribution in the Soviet Union (USSR), which led to the country becoming a major overseas market for Indian films.

Overview
Dharti Ke Lal was critically acclaimed for its scathing view of the notorious Bengal famine of 1943, in which millions of Bengali people died. It is considered an important political film as it gives a realistic portrayal of the changing social and economic climate during World War II.

The film uses the plight of a single family caught in this famine, and tells the story of human devastation, and the loss of humanity during the struggle to survive.

During the Bengal famine of 1943, members of the IPTA travelled all over India, performing plays and collecting funds for the survivors of the famine, which has destroyed a whole generation of farmer families in Bengal.
Thus Abbas was deeply influenced by the work of IPTA, and hence based his script upon two of IPTA's plays, Nabanna (Harvest) and Jabanbandi by Bijon Bhattacharya, and the story Annadata by Krishan Chander. Even the cast of the film was mainly actors from IPTA.

The film marked another chapter in the influential new wave in Indian cinema, which focussed on socially relevant themes as in Neecha Nagar (1946), made by Chetan Anand, also scripted by Abbas, and which continued with Bimal Roy's Do Bigha Zamin (1953).

It was the first and perhaps the only film produced by IPTA (Indian People's Theater Association) and remains one of the important Hindi films of that decade. The film marked the screen debut of Zohra Sehgal and also gave actor Balraj Sahni his first important on screen role.

The New York Times called it "...a gritty realistic drama."

It proved to be tremendously influential not only to future filmmakers who admired its neorealist-like qualities—but also to intellectuals of India's left-wing.

Cast

 Tripti Mitra
 Sombhu Mitra
 Balraj Sahni
 Rashid Ahmed
 Damayanti Sahni (Balraj Sahni's actual wife)
 Rashid Khan
 K. N. Singh
 David
 Zohra Sehgal
 Snehaprabha

Notes

References
 Dictionary of Films (Berkeley: U. of CA Press, 1977), p. 84.
 Vasudev and Lenglet, eds., Indian Cinema Super-bazaar (New Delhi: Vikas, 1978).
 Shyamala A. Narayan, The Journal of Commonwealth Literature, 1 1976; vol. 11: pp. 82 – 94.
 Amir Ullah Khan and Bibek Debroy, Indian Economic Transition through Bollywood Eyes.

External links
 
 Review in The New York Times (archived 30 April 2010)
 Abbas at ejumpcut
 Songs of Dharti Ke Lal (archived 5 February 2012)

1946 films
1940s Hindi-language films
Films based on short fiction
Films scored by Ravi Shankar
Indian films based on plays
Films about famine
Films directed by K. A. Abbas
Films set in 1943
Films set in India
Films with screenplays by Khwaja Ahmad Abbas
1940s Urdu-language films
Urdu-language Indian films
Indian World War II films
Indian black-and-white films
Indian drama films
1946 drama films
1946 directorial debut films